Spreepiraten is a German television series.

See also
List of German television series

External links
 

German children's television series
1989 German television series debuts
1991 German television series endings
Television shows set in Berlin
German-language television shows
ZDF original programming